The Goshen Central School District is a public school district in Orange County, New York, United States. It educates children in the village of Goshen and most of the town, as well as the Campbell Hall section of the neighboring Town of Hamptonburgh and part of the Town of Wallkill, including the hamlet of Michigan Corners. Established in 1937, it operates four schools, all located a short distance apart in the northwest corner of the village, and covering kindergarten through twelfth grade.

History
It was first established in 1937 through the combination of smaller school districts in the Goshen area. It uses the original high school building at the corner of Main (NY 207) and Erie streets, just across from the Harness Racing Museum & Hall of Fame and next to the Orange County Government Center, as its main office.

Schools
The district is organized so that each school handles the district's entire student population at their grade level.

Scotchtown Avenue Elementary School: Kindergarten-2
Goshen Intermediate School: Grades 3-5
C. J. Hooker Middle School: Grades 6-8
Goshen Central High School: Grades 9-12

References

External links
 

School districts in New York (state)
Education in Orange County, New York
Goshen, New York
1937 establishments in New York (state)
School districts established in 1937